Edward Harrison Walker (August 11, 1874 – September 29, 1947) was a Major League Baseball pitcher who played for two seasons. Born in Cambois, England, he played for the Cleveland Bronchos/Cleveland Naps during the 1902 Cleveland Bronchos season and the 1903 Cleveland Naps season, playing in four career games.

External links

1874 births
1947 deaths
Major League Baseball pitchers
Cleveland Bronchos players
Cleveland Naps players
Columbus Senators players
Hartford Senators players
Toledo Mud Hens players
Jacksonville Jays players
Zanesville Infants players
Quincy Vets players
Zanesville (minor league baseball) players
Sportspeople from Northumberland
Major League Baseball players from the United Kingdom
Major League Baseball players from England
English baseball players